Winter Holidays is a 1959 Italian comedy film directed by Camillo Mastrocinque and Giuliano Carnimeo (collaborating director), based on story by Oreste Biancoli. The music score is by Armando Trovajoli.

Cast
Alberto Sordi as  Roger Moretti
Michèle Morgan as  Steffa Tardier
Georges Marchal as  Georges Tardier
Vittorio De Sica as  Maurice
Eleonora Rossi Drago as  La comtesse Paola Parioli
Denise Provence as  Marceline
Dorian Gray as  Carol Field
Vira Silenti as  Vera
Christine Kaufmann as  Florence
Geronimo Meynier as  Franco
Mario Valdemarin as  Toni
Arielle Coigney as  Dina Moretti
Renato Salvatori as  Gianni
Pierre Cressoy as  Le comte Alfredo Parioli
Ruggero Marchi as  Produttore
Enzo Turco as  Magri
Mercedes Brignone as  Princess Valmarin
Lola Braccini as  Marchesa Serti
Anna Campori as  Virginia

External links

1959 films
1950s Italian-language films
1959 comedy films
Films directed by Camillo Mastrocinque
Films scored by Armando Trovajoli
Italian comedy films
1950s Italian films